Yekaterina Vladimirovna Shikhova (born 25 June 1985) is a Russian speed skater. She won a team bronze medal at the 2014 Winter Olympics, and an individual allround bronze medal at the 2013 World Championships.

Winter Olympics
At the 2010 Winter Olympics, Shikhova competed in two individual and one team events. In her the first event, the 1000 m, she finished 11th with a time of 1:17.46. In her second event, the 1500 m, she placed 8th with a time of 1:58.54. Her pursuit team finished seventh.

At the 2014 Olympics Shikhova added 3000 m to her previous three events. She won a bronze medal with the pursuit team, and placed 10th–20th individually.

Personal records

She is currently in 33rd position in the adelskalender.

World Cup podiums

References

External links

Yekaterina Shikhova's profile, from http://www.vancouver2010.com
Yekaterina Shikhova's profile, from SpeedskatingResults.com
Yekaterina Shikhova's season totals, from the-sports.org

1985 births
Russian female speed skaters
Speed skaters at the 2010 Winter Olympics
Speed skaters at the 2014 Winter Olympics
Olympic speed skaters of Russia
Sportspeople from Kirov, Kirov Oblast
Living people
Medalists at the 2014 Winter Olympics
Olympic medalists in speed skating
Olympic bronze medalists for Russia
World Allround Speed Skating Championships medalists
World Single Distances Speed Skating Championships medalists
Universiade medalists in speed skating
Universiade silver medalists for Russia
Speed skaters at the 2007 Winter Universiade
Medalists at the 2007 Winter Universiade